Charles Sherman Templeton (June 1, 1932 – October 9, 1997) was a pitcher in Major League Baseball. He pitched from 1955 to 1956 with the Brooklyn Dodgers.

His career was cut short due to an arm injury which took away the blazing fastball he had early in his career.  

He died at the age of 65

External links
 
bio article
Venezuelan Professional Baseball League batting and statistics

References

1932 births
1997 deaths
Brooklyn Dodgers players
Baseball players from Detroit
Denver Bears players
Des Moines Bruins players
Greenwood Dodgers players
Hazard Bombers players
LaGrange Troupers players
Leones del Caracas players
American expatriate baseball players in Venezuela
Major League Baseball pitchers
Montreal Royals players
St. Paul Saints (AA) players
Union City Dodgers players
Victoria Rosebuds players